Karl Robert Reichsgraf von Nesselrode-Ehreshoven, also known as Charles de Nesselrode (Russian: Карл Васильевич Нессельроде, Karl Vasilyevich Nesselrode; 14 December 1780 – 23 March 1862) was a Russian German diplomat. For forty years (1816–1856) Nesselrode guided Russian policy as foreign minister. He was also a leading European conservative statesman of the Holy Alliance.

Early life 
Karl von Nesselrode was born at sea
near Lisbon, Portugal into the Uradel House of Nesselrode which originated in the Bergisches Land near the Rhine. His father Count Wilhelm Karl von Nesselrode (1724 - 1810), a count of the Holy Roman Empire, served at the time as the ambassador to Portugal for the German-born  Russian empress. His mother was Louise Gontard (1746-1785), whose family belonged to Huguenot noble families from Dauphiné that fled from France to Germany in 1700. In deference to his mother's Protestantism he was baptized in the chapel of the British Embassy, thus becoming a member of the Church of England.

Biography 
After his father became the Russian ambassador to the Prussian court about 1787, Nesselrode's education in a Berlin  gymnasium re-inforced his Germanic roots. Even though Nesselrode would work for the Russians for the next few decades of his life, he could neither read nor write  Russian and spoke it only brokenly.

In 1788, at the age of 8, he officially entered the  Russian Navy. With his father's influence, he secured the position of naval aide-de-camp to Emperor Paul.

He then transferred to the  army, and entered diplomatic service under Paul I's son and successor, Emperor Alexander I. He was attached to the Russian embassy at Berlin, and transferred thence to The Hague.

In August 1806 Nesselrode received a commission to travel in southern Germany to report on the French troops there; he was then attached as diplomatic secretary to general  Kamenski, and then to (ethnic German) generals  Buxhoewden and  Bennigsen in succession.

He was present at the inconclusive Battle of Eylau in January 1807, fought by Count von Bennigsen, and assisted at the negotiations of the Peace of Tilsit (July 1807), for which he was commended by Spanish Bonapartist Diego Fernandez de Velasco, 13th Duke of Frías (who in 1811 would die in exile in Paris). During negotiations he was seated at the table with Napoleon I.

Following the Congress of Erfurt in 1808, Nesselrode was secretly accredited by Alexander to serve as his unofficial channel of information between himself and Talleyrand. 

Nesselrode became State Secretary in 1814 and was the head of Russia's official delegation to the Congress of Vienna, but for the most part Alexander I acted as his own foreign minister. In 1816, Nesselrode became Russian foreign minister, sharing influence with Count Ioannis Kapodistrias until the latter's retirement in 1822.

For forty years, Nesselrode guided Russian policy and was a leading European conservative statesman of the Holy Alliance. He was a key contributor in the construction of the peaceable congress system after the Napoleonic Wars. Between 1845 and 1856, he served as Chancellor of the Russian Empire. As Minister of Foreign Affairs in 1824, he was a plenipotentiary during negotiations with the United States in defining the boundary between Russian America and the American claims known as the Oregon Country, which were resolved with the Russo-American Treaty of 1824, and a parallel treaty with Britain concerning British claims which overlapped with those of the U.S.  A century later in 1924, Mount Nesselrode in the Boundary Ranges of the Alaska-British Columbia boundary was named for him.

In 1849 Nesselrode sent Russian troops to aid Austria in putting down the  Hungarian revolution led by Lajos Kossuth.

One frequently-overlooked facet of Nesselrode's activity involved his attempts to penetrate Japan's  self-isolation. In 1853 he dispatched Yevfimiy Putyatin with a letter to the shōgun; Putyatin returned to St. Petersburg with the favorable Treaty of Shimoda (signed 1855).

Nesselrode's efforts to expand Russia's influence in the Balkans and Mediterranean led to conflicts with Turkey, Britain, the then Kingdom of Sardinia, the then Duchy of Savoy and France, which all became allies opposing Russia in the Crimean War (1853–1856). Britain and France, unhappy with Russia's growing influence, determined to support Turkey and so restrict Russia.

Nesselrode's autobiography was published posthumously in 1866.

Marriage and issue 
He was married Russian noblewoman Maria Guryeva (1786-1849) and had:

 Countess Elena von Nesselrode (1815-1875) married Count Michail Chreptowicz (1809-1892); didn't have issue
 Count Dimitri von Nesselrode (1816-1891) married Countess Lydia Zakrevskaya (1826-1884); had issue
 Countess Marie von Nesselrode (1820-1888) married Count Albin Leo von Seebach (1811-1884); had issue

Honours 
 Knight of the Order of Saint Alexander Nevsky.
 Knight grand Cross of the Order of Saint Vladimir.
 Knight of the Order of the Elephant.
 Knight grand Cross of the Order of the Polar Star.
 Knight grand Cross of the Order of the Crown.
 Knight grand Cross of the Royal Guelphic Order.
 Knight grand Cross of the House Order of Fidelity.
 Knight of the Order of the White Eagle.
 Knight grand Cross of the Order of Saint Stephen of Hungary.
 Knight grand Cross of the Order of the Holy Ghost.
 Knight grand Cross of the Order of Saint Michael.
 Knight grand Cross of the Order of the Black Eagle.
 Knight grand Cross of the Order of the Red Eagle.
 Knight grand Cross of the Supreme Order of the Most Holy Annunciation.
 Knight grand Cross of the Order of Charles III.
 Knight grand Cross of the Order of Saint Ferdinand and of Merit.
 Grand Cross in the Legion of Honour.

Cuisine legacy
Foods named in his honour but devised by his chef M. Jean Mouy using chestnut puree are-
 
 Nesselrode Pudding (Pouding à la Nesselrode), a thick custard cream with sweet puree of chestnut, raisins, candied fruit, currants, cherry liquor and whipped cream molded and served chilled as a bombe with maraschino custard sauce.

 Nesselrode Pie, a chestnut custard cream pie

References

Further reading
 Cowles, Loyal. "The Failure to Restrain Russia: Canning, Nesselrode, and the Greek Question, 1825–1827." International History Review 12.4 (1990): 688-720.
 Grimsted, Patricia Kennedy. The foreign ministers of Alexander I: political attitudes and the conduct of Russian diplomacy, 1801-1825 (University of California Press, 1969)
 Ingle, Harold N. Nesselrode and the Russian rapprochement with Britain, 1836-1844 (University of California Press, 1976)
 Jelavich, Barbara. St. Petersburg and Moscow:  Tsarist and Soviet Foreign Policy, 1814-1974 (1974) 
 Schroeder, Paul W. The transformation of European politics, 1763-1848 (Oxford: Clarendon Press, 1994)

1780 births
1862 deaths
People from Lisbon
Baltic-German people
Westphalian nobility
Russian nobility
Foreign ministers of the Russian Empire
Chancellors of the Russian Empire
Members of the State Council (Russian Empire)
Diplomats of the Russian Empire
18th-century people from the Russian Empire
19th-century people from the Russian Empire
Burials at Smolensky Lutheran Cemetery
18th-century politicians from the Russian Empire
19th-century politicians from the Russian Empire
Counts of the Holy Roman Empire
M
People born at sea